Scareheads is a 1931 American crime film directed by Noel M. Smith and starring Richard Talmadge, Gareth Hughes, Julie Bishop.

Plot

Cast
 Richard Talmadge as Dick Tanner 
 Gareth Hughes
 Julie Bishop
 Joseph W. Girard
 Virginia True Boardman
 King Baggot
 Lloyd Whitlock
 Walter James
 Edward Lynch 
 Nancy Caswell

References

Bibliography
 Michael R. Pitts. Poverty Row Studios, 1929–1940: An Illustrated History of 55 Independent Film Companies, with a Filmography for Each. McFarland & Company, 2005.

External links
 

1931 films
1931 crime films
American crime films
Films directed by Noel M. Smith
1930s English-language films
1930s American films